Intercity Transit is a public transportation agency organized as a municipal corporation in Thurston County, Washington, United States. It operates 21 bus routes, the Dial-A-Lift door-to-door service, a vanpool program, and specialized van programs.

Intercity Transit maintains a free shuttle route called Dash, which provides service between the Capitol Campus and downtown Olympia via Capitol Way. Dash runs every fifteen minutes on weekdays, and every ten minutes on weekends, and is close to several public parking lots.

In 2009, the American Public Transportation Association gave Intercity Transit the America's Best Public Transportation System award for the mid-size category.

Intercity Transit began a five-year zero-fare pilot project in January 2020 as part of its service expansion approved in a 2018 ballot measure. The agency also launched a zero-fare express bus route connecting Capital Mall to Lacey in September 2019. The pilot was extended to 2028 amid the COVID-19 pandemic, which also forced the suspension of the express route and Dash.

Fleet

Intercity Transit operates 77 coaches, 33 Dial-A-Lift vans, and 221 vanpool vans. Intercity Transit purchased six new hybrid electric buses in 2010, and nine new hybrid electric buses in 2014. Intercity Transit is one of the first transportation systems in the country to use an all-biodiesel fleet.

All of Intercity Transit's coaches are Gillig Low Floor buses. They are equipped with wheelchair accessibility, kneeling doors, automatic stop announcements, and surveillance cameras.

References

Bus transportation in Washington (state)
Sound Transit
Transportation in Thurston County, Washington
Lacey, Washington